Five naval vessels of Japan have been named Chiyoda:

 (1866), Japan's first domestically built, engine-powered warship
 (1891), a protected cruiser of the Imperial Japanese Navy during the First Sino-Japanese War, Russo-Japanese War and World War I
, a submarine rescue ship of the Japan Maritime Self-Defense Force, commissioned in 1985 and struck in 2018
, a submarine rescue ship of the Japanese Navy launched in 2016

Imperial Japanese Navy ship names
Japanese Navy ship names